Cañita is a corregimiento in Chepo District, Panamá Province, Panama with a population of 2,514 as of 2010. Its population as of 1990 was 1,721; its population as of 2000 was 2,140.

References

Corregimientos of Panamá Province